Mirotice is a town in Písek District in the South Bohemian Region of the Czech Republic. It has about 1,200 inhabitants. It is known as the birthplace of Mikoláš Aleš.

Administrative parts
Villages of Bořice, Jarotice, Lučkovice, Obora u Radobytec, Radobytce, Rakovické Chalupy, Stráž and Strážovice are administrative parts of Mirotice.

Notable people
Benedikt Schack (1758–1826), composer and operatic tenor
Matěj Kopecký (1775–1847), puppeteer, lived here
Alexander Seik (1824–1905), photographer
Mikoláš Aleš (1852–1913), painter

References

External links

Cities and towns in the Czech Republic
Populated places in Písek District
Prácheňsko